A Talent for Loving is a 1969 British-American comedy Western film directed by Richard Quine and starring Richard Widmark, Chaim Topol, and Cesar Romero. It is based on the 1961 parodic Western novel A Talent for Loving, or The Great Cowboy Race by Richard Condon, who also wrote the screenplay. The home video version of the film (Simitar Entertainment) is re-titled Gun Crazy and has been edited to 95 minutes.

In December 1965, Walter Shenson offered A Talent for Loving to Brian Epstein as a film vehicle for The Beatles, and it was rejected unanimously.

Plot
A gambler named Patten wins the deed to a Mexican ranch, but finds a curse has been placed on the place. Don Jose must marry off his beautiful, nymphomaniacal daughter to permanently free her of the curse.

Cast
Richard Widmark as Major Patten
Chaim Topol as Molina
Cesar Romero as Don Jose
Geneviève Page as Delphine
Fran Jeffries as Maria
Derek Nimmo as Moodie
Max Showalter as Franklin
Joe Melia as Tortillaw
John Bluthal as Martinelli
Libby Morris as Jacaranda
Judd Hamilton as Jim
Caroline Munro as Evalina Patten

References

External links

1969 films
1960s Western (genre) comedy films
British Western (genre) comedy films
Films directed by Richard Quine
Films set in Mexico
Films based on American novels
Paramount Pictures films
Films shot in Almería
1969 comedy films
Films scored by Ken Thorne
1960s English-language films
1960s British films